This is a list of the busiest airports in Central America by passenger traffic, a statistic available for almost all the airstrips taken into account. The present list intends to include all the international and domestic airports located in the area geographically defined as Central America, comprising Belize, Guatemala, El Salvador, Honduras, Nicaragua, Costa Rica, and Panama.

Because each country has a different body to control these statistics, the compilation of data is difficult and not homogeneously distributed. The information here presented represents the best available data in different Internet sources. The ranking is ordered according to total passenger traffic (unless the footnotes indicate otherwise). Information on aircraft movements or cargo movements is not available for all the airports.

At a glance

Ranking of airports, 2018

Ranking of airports, 2016

Ranking of airports, 2015

Ranking of airports, 2014

Ranking of airports, 2013

Ranking of airports, 2012

Ranking of airports, 2011

Ranking of airports, 2010

Ranking of airports, 2009
Ordered by total passenger traffic, international and domestic, with final data for 2009.

Ranking of airports, 2008
According to Airports Council International's World Airport Traffic Report 2009, and ordered by total passenger traffic (international and domestic), total aircraft movements and total cargo (freight and mail, in metric tonnes). Information for Guatemala and Belize airports are excluded in this report, as well as some other airports in Costa Rica Rica and Panama.

Ranking of airports, 2006
According to Airports Council International's World Airport Traffic Report 2006, and ordered by total passenger traffic (international and domestic), total aircraft movements and total cargo (freight and mail, in metric tonnes). Information for Guatemala and Belize airports are excluded in this report, as well as some other airports in Costa Rica Rica and Panama.

Ranking of airports, 2005
According to Airports Council International's World Airport Traffic Report 2006, and ordered by total passenger traffic (international and domestic), total aircraft movements and total cargo (freight and mail, in metric tonnes). Information for Guatemala and Belize airports are excluded in this report, as well as some other airports in Costa Rica Rica and Panama.

See also
 List of the busiest airports in the Caribbean
 List of the busiest airports in Latin America
 List of the busiest airports in South America

Notes
1. Total passenger Traffic (ICAO standard and ACI Standard):Reporte Estadistico 2016.
2. Total passenger Traffic for 2016, as presented by Costa Rica's Civil Aviation Authority website, Resumen Estadístico 2016. Data for Juan Santamaría International Airport is estimated for both international and domestic passengers.
3. Data according to the Autonomous Port Executive Commission Statistics Department. 
4. Total Passenger Traffic according to the Air Transport Statistics Unit, Directorate General of Civil Aviation. Sum up of Total Arrivals and Total Departures.
5. Information available on the airport website. See "Traffic Data" section. The number represents the sum of total International Incoming, International Departure, Domestic Incoming and Domestic Departure passengers, for the year in question.
6. La Nación (San José, Costa Rica). Aeropuerto internacional Daniel Oduber supera los 4 millones de pasajeros en los últimos cinco años, January 12, 2017. 
7. Total Passenger Traffic for 2016, according to the Philip S.W. Goldson International Airport Authority About us.
8. El Heraldo (Tegucigalpa, Honduras). Honduras:En 14% aumenta el flujo de viajeros por aeropuertos.
9. Important: 2015 Total Passenger Traffic only, as presented on the airport website. 2015 Annual Statistics Report.
10. Important: 2015 Traffic Data for January–October only. Total Traffic according to the Institutional Yearbook, 2015 of Panama's Civil Aviation Authority.
11. Important: 2014 Domestic Passenger Traffic only, according to Panama's Civil Aviation Authority website, Domestic statistics 2014 for Marcos A. Gelabert Airport.
12. Total traffic, according to the Ministry of Transport and Infrastructure. 2015 Nicaragua's Transport Statistical Yearbook.
13. Total traffic, according to the Civil Aviation authority of Guatemala, Regional Airport Statistics, 2015.
14. Data according to the Autonomous Port Executive Commission Statistics Department. Ilopango International Airport Statistics, 2015.
15. Total passenger Traffic (ICAO standard and ACI Standard):Annual Report 2017.

References

Aviation in Central America
Airports in Central America
 
Airports
Central America